One Palliser Square is a 27-story office building in the Calgary downtown core. One Palliser Square is connected to the Calgary Tower via the Tower Centre complex. Accessed from the main floor, this complex is home to a variety of businesses including two theatre companies—Vertigo Mystery Theatre's Playhouse and Studio stages and Lunchbox Theatre—Tower Physio and Calgary's theatre hangout, The Auburn Saloon. As of 2005, the building was owned and operated by Aspen Properties.

See also
List of tallest buildings in Calgary

References

Buildings and structures in Calgary